Onești is a commune in Hînceşti District, Moldova. It is composed of two villages, Onești and Strîmbeni.

References

Communes of Hîncești District